The Republic of Rwanda, a member of the East African Community, allows citizens of all countries that are not visa exempt to obtain a visa on arrival. In addition, they may also obtain an e-Visa online before departure.  All visitors must hold a passport valid for at least six months with at least one empty page. Kenyans and Ugandans may use an ID card in lieu of a passport to enter Rwanda.

Visa policy map

Visa exemption
Citizens of the following countries are exempt from paying entry fees, and can enter Rwanda without a visa for up to the duration listed below:

Holders of diplomatic and service category passports of China, Djibouti, Ethiopia, Gabon, India, Israel, Morocco, Mozambique, Namibia, Turkey, and United Arab Emirates do not require a visa.

In addition, nationals of China holding passports endorsed "for public affairs" do not need a visa for a maximum stay of 90 days.

Visa on arrival

Visitors from all countries have been eligible for visa on arrival since 1 January 2018. Citizens of Common Market for Eastern and Southern Africa countries that are not visa exempt receive visas valid for 90 days, while other visitors are granted visas valid for 30 days. Since 10 March 2020, nationals of member states of either the African Union, the Commonwealth of Nations or La Francophonie are waived visa fees that are normally payable when obtaining a visa on arrival.

eVisa
Citizens of countries that are not visa-exempt may also obtain a visa online or at a Rwandan diplomatic mission, if they prefer. An entry visa is valid for a single entry for a period not exceeding 30 days and is processed within three working days.

See also

 Visa requirements for Rwandan citizens
 Rwandan passport

References

Rwanda